Beit Berl College is a multi-disciplinary academic college for higher education located in Beit Berl in the Sharon region of Israel. It is one of the oldest colleges in Israel.

The college grants undergraduate degrees (B.Ed and B.Ed.F.A.) and graduate degrees (M.Ed and M.Teach) in a variety of disciplines in teaching and education (formal and informal), in the Arts (Fine Arts, Film, Art Education, Art Therapy), Humanities, and Social Sciences. The college also issues teaching certificates for academics and various types of diplomas.

History
Beit Berl was established in 1949 on the grounds of Kalmania farm as an educational institution of Mapai. It was designed to realize and perpetuate the ideological legacy of Berl Katznelson; after immigrating to Mandatory Palestine, Katznelson worked on the educational issues of the Yishuv as a whole and of the Zionist Labor Movement in particular. In 1938, during the fourth Mapai conference, Katznelson publicly presented his views on the seminary of the Labor movement. Weeks after his death, in September 1944, it was decided that a seminary would be established for youth counselors and activists in Katznelson's name. The institute's cornerstone laying ceremony took place on the second anniversary of his death in 1946. In 1949, a movement seminary opened in Beit Berl, in which a seminar for teachers and kindergarten teachers was also established. In the 60s, the seminar developed and began to focus more on academic studies.

In the summer of 1968, at the initiative of the then-director general of Beit Berl, Nahum Shamir, a proclamation was published announcing the establishment of the Berl Katznelson University Institute for Research and Education, and the Council for Higher Education in Israel recognized the seminar as an academic college of education in 1971.

Overview
The faculty consists of about 600 lecturers active in all fields of teaching and research, and over 8,000 students studying in three faculties and the Keshet Center for Professional Development:

Faculty of Education
HaMidrasha – Faculty of the Arts
Faculty of Society and Culture

From 2008-2020, Tamar Ariav was President of the College. Yuli Tamir, an Israeli academic and former politician, became President in October 2020.

Faculty of Education
The Faculty of Education, headed by Dean Ilana Paul-Binyamin, combines many fields under one roof. It provides a framework for undergraduate studies in teaching, a master's degree in education counseling, education planning and evaluation, learning disabilities: assessment and educational intervention, management and organization of educational systems, support of at-risk and distressed youth, teaching and learning: languages and education and Arab heritage. Academics are offered various teacher training programs and a master's program in teaching secondary school. The facility offers educational studies and operates support programs and resources for the teacher training processes, as well as the processes of entering the profession.

The Arab Academic Institute for Education- The institute, which operates within the framework of the Faculty of Education, was established in 1971 and since 1981 has been operating within the Beit Berl College. The institute offers a variety of tracks and courses for an undergraduate degree in teaching (B.Ed.) in various teaching subjects taught in Israel's Arab schools in special education, early childhood, primary school, secondary school and informal education.

Faculty of the Arts

HaMidrasha School of Art was established in 1946 and operated as a night school. The name was later changed to reflect its educational goals, i.e. training art teachers. Among the administrators were Arieh Elwell, Nahum Gutman, Moshe Avigal and Aharon Avni. In 1964, HaMidrasha was recognized by the Ministry of Education and Culture. In 1966, Ran Shechori was appointed to head the college, serving in this position until 1980. Under the leadership of Shechori, HaMidrasha moved to buildings in Herzliya in 1972, which were made available to the Ministry of Education and Culture by the municipality. In 1977 HaMidrasha moved again, this time to Ramat Hasharon. That same year, the Institute for the Training of Arts Teachers was established within HaMidrasha.

Following the end of Shechori's term, in 1980, Shlomo Vitkin was appointed director of HaMidrasha and stayed in the role until 1997. During his tenure, in 1987, HaMidrasha merged with Beit Berl College. In 1989, the “Open Graduate School” art curriculum was established, which today is called the “Individual Curriculum in Art”. In the same year, the Department of Art Therapy was also established.

In 1995, HaMidrasha moved to a dedicated campus in the “Kalmania” complex at Beit Berl College. In 1997 Yair Garbuz replaced Vitkin as head of HaMidrasha. Uri Hakem was appointed director of the art school. In 1999, HaMidrasha became an academic institution and received accreditation from the Council of Higher Education to award a B.Ed. F.A. in Art. In 2008, HaMidrasha received approval from the Council for Higher Education for its  Master's program in Art Education (M.Ed.).

In 2019, artist Doron Rabina was appointed head of the school and an undergraduate Film Studies program (B.Ed.F.A.) opened. In 2010, a postgraduate program in art was opened, headed by Roee Rosen, and the head of its theoretical studies was the curator Yehoshua Simon. In 2011, the preparatory program for art studies in the Arab sector was opened. In 2013, the Master's Program in Art Education received a final degree certificate.

Later that year, Beit Berl College moved to an institutional building, and the official name of HaMidrasha became HaMidrasha – Faculty of the Arts. Doron Rabina was appointed Dean of the Faculty. In the same year, the Graduate School received a certificate to grant undergraduate degrees (B.Ed.) in a dual-discipline program that combines a BA degree in art theory with another degree. In 2013, artist Miri Segal replaced Roee Rosen as head of the Graduate Studies program at HaMidrasha, and curator Avi Lubin was appointed head of the theoretical studies program. In 2014, HaMidrasha Gallery opened at 19 Hayarkon Street in Tel Aviv. In 2015, artist Gabi Klezmer was appointed Dean of the Faculty.

HaMidrasha – Faculty of the Arts teaches Israel's artists and filmmakers who hold productive and lively dialogue with the world of contemporary art. The faculty's programs work to enable the student to develop independent thinking and to establish their own unique artistic path. The faculty  is headed by Dean Guy Ben-Ner and includes the Art Department, the Film Department, and the Department of Art Therapy. The Art Department is the only institution in Israel that combines Fine Art studies with the training of artists-teachers towards a bachelor's degree, a graduate of Arts Teaching, as well as the dual-discipline program for teaching of art theory and another field of the student's choice from the Faculty of Society and Culture. The Department of Art also includes the master's degree program in Art Education, the Master of Art Therapy program-Visual Arts, the program of continuing education for young artists who have received their undergraduate degree, and certificate studies in art. The Film Department includes a program for undergraduate studies in cinema and film teaching, as well as documentary studies in cinema.

Notable faculty and alumni 
Gideon Gechtman
 Boaz Arad
Simcha Shirman
Roee Rosen
Michal Heiman
Guy Ben-Ner
 Hillel Roman

Faculty of Society and Culture

The Faculty of Society and Culture offers courses and teaching programs in a variety of fields in social sciences and humanities. Headed by Dean Nurit Buchweitz, the faculty teaches courses in the fields of social sciences and citizenship, literature, bible studies, Jewish culture, Arabic, languages, history, and Israeli studies and geography for teacher training. In addition, the faculty conducts courses in criminology and law enforcement, social-organizational management, security and homeland security, and gender studies. The teaching staff includes lecturers and experts with extensive experience in their field.

In 2018, Professor Nava Ben-Zvi was awarded the Israel Prize, the country's highest honor. She received the prize for Lifetime Achievement in Education in part for her role on the team that established Open University in the 1970s, which aimed to make education accessible to the general population.

See also
Education in Israel

References

Further reading
Adam Doron and Shlomo Ben-Ami, Beit Berl: History and Problems; Published by Yossi Eliasi, Tsofit: Beit Berl Publishing, 1981.
Katsia Avieli-Tabibian, Berl and Beit Berl-Party and Education: The Idea and its Implementation, 1944–1972: Social, Educational and Political Analysis, Dissertation, Tel Aviv University, 2005.

External links
Official website

 
Colleges in Israel